Hurricane Peak is a  mountain summit located in San Juan County of southwest Colorado, United States. It is situated equidistant between the historic towns of Ouray and Silverton, and is approximately nine miles west of the Continental Divide. It is part of the San Juan Mountains which are a subset of the Rocky Mountains. Neighbors include Abrams Mountain 3.4 miles to the north, and Red Mountain 2.2 miles to the west. The Mountain Queen Mine, which is located on the east slope of Hurricane Peak at the head of California Gulch, is one of the oldest workings in the area and was most active from 1878 to 1880. The mountain's name, which has been officially adopted by the United States Board on Geographic Names, was in use in 1906 when Henry Gannett published it in the Gazetteer of Colorado.

Climate 
According to the Köppen climate classification system, Hurricane Peak is located in an alpine subarctic climate zone with cold, snowy winters, and cool to warm summers. Due to its altitude, it receives precipitation all year, as snow in winter, and as thunderstorms in summer, with a dry period in late spring. Precipitation runoff from the mountain drains into tributaries of the Animas and Uncompahgre Rivers.

See also

References

External links 

 Weather forecast: Hurricane Peak

Mountains of San Juan County, Colorado
San Juan Mountains (Colorado)
Mountains of Colorado
North American 4000 m summits